The Royal Vancouver Yacht Club (RVYC) is a yacht club located in Vancouver, British Columbia. Royal Vancouver Yacht Club currently operates two marinas, the one at Jericho Beach in English Bay and another in Coal Harbour. The Jericho site includes a clubhouse, two restaurants, and berths enough for 350 as well as a dinghy dock. In 2017 the award-winning Dock Building was completed, designed by Michael Green Architecture, providing offices for the Harbour Master, instruction and amenity space and workshops to maintain boats, sails, and gear. The Coal Harbour site has approximately 350 berths, some with covered moorage, and is also the location of the Mermaid Inn. The club also has seven offshore stations in BC waters.

History
The club was founded as the Vancouver Yacht Club in 1903. The club officially became the 'Royal Vancouver Yacht Club' in 1906. J. Kennerly Bryan and his partner Mr. Waterson designed the Royal Vancouver Yacht Club club house in Stanley park (1910). The permanent yacht club located at Jericho Beach was opened 21 years later in 1927. Fred Laughton Townley & Mr. Matheson designed the Royal Vancouver Yacht Club club house on Point Grey Road at Highbury Street in 1926

In 1940–41, the Royal Canadian Navy Reserves scheme for training yacht club members developed the first central registry system.

In 1970, George A Cran edited 'Annals of the Royal Vancouver Yacht Club, 1903–1970' which was condensed and rewritten from records of G.B. Warren, first historian of the club, and the personal recollections of the members of the History Committee, R.V.Y.C., by Norman Hacking.' The Club Annals provides a history of the RVYC's "founding, granting of the Royal Charter, prominent early yachtsmen, racing contests and trophies, officers of the Club, and a general review of sail and power boat activity for sixty-two years in the waters of Burrard Inlet and English Bay, Vancouver, B.C., and Gulf of Georgia, British Columbia, Canada."

In 1986, M. Watson MacCrostie edited 'Annals of the Royal Vancouver Yacht Club, 1971–1985': an updating of the history of Club's members, boats, events and trophies as they appear (or have been amended) in the Year Books, Seabreezes and Annual Reports of the years 1971–1985. The information was taken and rewritten from the records and pictures in the Archives of the Club

In 2003, as part of the Club's centennial celebrations, James P Delgado wrote 'Racers and rovers: 100 years of the Royal Vancouver Yacht Club.'

Traditions
The Royal Vancouver Yacht Club has a collection of model yachts. 'My Calliope', for example, designed by naval architect Jack Hargrave was donated to the club on 31 May 2012.

List of Offshore stations
Tugboat Island, Silva Bay (1960)
Alexandra Island, Centre Bay (1965)
Secret Cove (1972)
Salt Spring Island, Scott Point (1977)
Wigwam Inn, Indian Arm (1985)
Garden Bay (1989)
Cortes Island, Cortes Bay (1993)

Notable members
Colin Hansen, former provincial politician 
Jimmy Pattison, businessman
Jason Priestley, actor
Nardwuar, radio personality
Andrew Saxton, former federal politician
Chip Wilson, founder Lululemon

See also

List of International Council of Yacht Clubs members

Notes

References
'Annals of the Royal Vancouver Yacht Club, 1903–1965: A history of organized racing and cruising in British Columbia Coastal Waters' (Vancouver, 1965, Royal Vancouver Yacht Club)
'Annals of the Royal Vancouver Yacht Club, 1971–1985: A history of organized racing and cruising in British Columbia Coastal Waters' (Vancouver, 1986, Royal Vancouver Yacht Club)

External links

 List of Civilian organizations with prefix "Royal" – Heritage Canada.
 List of civilian organizations with the prefix "Royal" prepared by the Department of Canadian Heritage
Library and Archives Canada Images of Royal Vancouver Yacht Club
on Marinas.Com
RVYC slideshow on Flickr
Royal Vancouver Yacht Club on YouTube

Royal yacht clubs
Yacht clubs in Canada
Sports venues in Vancouver
1903 establishments in British Columbia
History of Vancouver
Buildings and structures completed in 1927
Sport in Vancouver
Buildings and structures in Vancouver
Culture of Vancouver
Organizations based in Vancouver
Tourist attractions in Vancouver